Side B Christians are Christians who identify as LGBT, but take a traditional view of human sexuality and thus remain celibate. The term Side B derives from an Internet forum where Side A Christians, with an affirming view of LGBT sexuality, were contrasted with Side B Christians. Prominent Side B Christians include Eve Tushnet, a lesbian Catholic based in Washington, DC, and Bekah Mason, executive director of Revoice. In particular, Side B Christians reject conversion therapy.

History
The distinction between Side A and Side B first took place as part of the Gay Christian Network, founded by Justin Lee. Some make additional distinctions, including Side X, representing ex-gay Christians. In 2018, Revoice was launched as a conference for Christians predominantly identifying as Side B. Much of the movement of celibate LGBT Christians has its origins in the US evangelical movement.

Prominent Side B Christians
 Eve Tushnet

See also

 Christianity
 Christianity and homosexuality
 Ex-gay movement
 Christianity and sexual orientation
 Homosexuality and religion
 History of Christianity and homosexuality
 Queer theology
 The Bible and homosexuality

References

 
Christian terminology
New Testament Greek words and phrases
Religious identity